Seir or SEIR may refer to:

Mount Seir, a mountainous region stretching between the Dead Sea and the Gulf of Aqaba
Seir the Horite, chief of the Horites, a people mentioned in the Torah
Sa'ir, also Seir, a Palestinian town in the Hebron Governorate in the West Bank 
Seir, a demon in the Ars Goetia
Southeast Indian Ridge (SEIR), is a mid-ocean ridge in the southern Indian Ocean
SEIR model, a compartmental model in epidemiology
Single-engine instrument rating, an aircraft pilot qualification

See also
Sear (disambiguation)
Sere (disambiguation)
Osiris, an Egyptian god
Sah (god), in Egyptian mythology the deification of the constellation Orion
Seri people, an indigenous group of the Mexican state of Sonora